Liz Irving (born 7 February 1965 in Brisbane, Queensland) is a squash coach and former professional squash player from Australia.

Irving was runner-up to her fellow Australian player Michelle Martin at the World Open in 1993. She was also a three-time finalist at the British Open, losing the final to New Zealand's Susan Devoy in 1988, and to Martin in 1994 and 1995. Irving won the mixed doubles titles at the inaugural World Doubles Squash Championships in 1997 (partner Dan Jenson). She reached a career-high ranking of World No. 2 in 1988.

Her greatest successes came in four consecutive World Team Championships when she was part of the winning Australian team during the 1992 Women's World Team Squash Championships held in Vancouver, British Columbia, Canada, the 1994 Women's World Team Squash Championships held in Saint Peter Port, Guernsey, the 1996 Women's World Team Squash Championships held in Malaysia and the 1998 Women's World Team Squash Championships held in Germany.

Since retiring as a player, Irving has settled in Amsterdam, where she has coached top international female players, including Nicol David and Vanessa Atkinson.

World Open

Finals: 1 (0 title, 1 runner-up)

World Team Championships

Finals: 6 (4 title, 2 runner-up)

References

External links
 

Australian female squash players
Squash coaches
Sportswomen from Queensland
1965 births
Living people
Sportspeople from Brisbane